Ortiz is a Spanish-language patronymic surname meaning "son of Orti". "Orti" seems to be disputed in meaning, deriving from either Basque, Latin fortis meaning "brave, strong", or Latin fortunius meaning "fortunate". Officials of the Spanish Inquisition in Toledo, Spain, wrote in the 1590s that "this surname Ortiz, although they have few sanbenitos, is in this city a very converso lineage and surname".

People
Aaron Ortiz, U.S. politician, Illinois state Representative
Abdalá Bucaram Ortiz (born 1952), president of Ecuador 1996–1997
Adalberto Ortiz (1914–2003), Ecuadorian novelist, poet and diplomat
Aldo Ortiz (a.k.a. Ricky Santana) (born 1960), Mexican professional wrestler
Alfonso Ortiz (1939–1998), Native American cultural anthropologist
 Alfredo Ortiz, American businessman; president and CEO of Job Creators Network since 2014
Álvaro Ortiz (footballer) (born 1978), Mexican football player
Ana Alicia Ortiz (born 1956), Mexican-American actress
Bernardo Ortiz de Montellano (1899–1949), Mexican writer and Contemporáneos magazine founder
Beto Ortiz (born 1978), Peruvian-American journalist, TV personality, and writer
Carlos Ortiz (boxer) (1936–2022), Puerto Rican boxer
Carlos Julián Ortiz (born 1974), Cuban freestyle wrestler
Carlos Ortiz Longo (born 1962), American (Puerto Rico).  US Space Program engineer, scientist, and pilot
Celso Ortiz (born 1989), Paraguayan football player
Claudette Ortiz (born 1981), American soul singer
Claudia Ortiz (born 1981), Peruvian beauty pageant winner
Daniel Ortiz (disambiguation), multiple people
Danny Ortiz (1976–2004), Guatemalan football player
Darwin Ortiz (born 1948), American gambler, magician, and author
David Ortiz (a.k.a. Big Papi), (born 1975), Dominican baseball player
Deborah Ortiz (born 1957), American politician, state senator from California
Dianna Ortiz (1958–2021), American Roman Catholic nun kidnapped and tortured by the Guatemalan defense forces in 1989
Diego Ortiz (c. 1510–1580), Spanish composer and music theorist
Diogo Ortiz de Villegas (1457–1519), Spanish-Portuguese theologian and astronomer
Domingo Ortiz, American musician
Elín Ortiz (1934–2016), Puerto Rican actor, comedian and producer
Emmanuel Ortiz (born 1974), Chicano/Puerto Rican/Irish-American activist and poet
Enrique Ortiz (disambiguation), multiple people
Enrique Ortiz de Landázuri Izarduy (a.k.a. Enrique Bunbury), (Born 1967), Spanish singer-songwriter
Eulalio Martín Gutiérrez Ortiz (1881–1939), president of Mexico 1914–1915
Félix Ortiz (born 1959), American politician in the New York Assembly
Fernando Ortiz Fernández (1881–1969), Cuban, essayist, ethnomusicologist, and scholar of Afro-Cuban culture
Fernando Ortiz Arana (born 1944), Mexican politician and legislator
Francisco Ortiz Franco (1954–2004), Mexican journalist
Francisco Pradilla Ortiz (1848–1921), Spanish artist
Gerardo Ortiz (born 1989), Mexican singer 
Guillermo Ortiz Martínez (born 1948), governor of the Bank of Mexico
Guillermo Iberio Ortiz Mayagoitia (born 1941), chief justice of the Supreme Court of Mexico
Guillermo Rigondeaux Ortiz (born 1980), Cuban boxer
Héctor Ortiz Ortiz (born 1950), governor of the Mexican state of Tlaxcala
Héctor Herrera Ortiz (born 1959), Cuban Olympic medalist (1992) in the 800 meters
Hilda Ortiz Clayton (1991-2013), American U.S. Army specialist and war photographer
Ismael Ortiz (born 1982), Panamanian swimmer in the 2004 Olympics
Juan Laurentino Ortiz (Argentine poet) (1896–1978)
Junior Ortiz (born 1959), Puerto Rican baseball catcher
Joell Ortiz (born 1980), American rapper
John Ortiz (born 1969), American actor and co-founder of LAByrinth Theater Company
Jorge Ortiz (Argentine footballer) (born 1984)
Jorge Ortiz (Spanish footballer) (born 1992)
José Ortiz (disambiguation), numerous individuals
Josefa Ortiz de Domínguez (a.k.a. La Corregidora) (1768–1829), conspirator and supporter of the Mexican War of Independence
Judith Ortiz Cofer (1952–2016), Puerto Rican author
Leonor de Todos los Santos de Borbón y Ortiz (born 2005), Princess of Asturias
Letizia Ortiz Rocasolano (born 1972), Queen of Spain
Lisa Ortiz (born 1974), American voice actress
Liza M. Ortiz (born 1974), Puerto Rican politician
Lucas Ortíz (born 1999), Uruguayan footballer
Ludwig Ortiz (born 1976), Venezuelan judoka
Luis Ortiz (disambiguation), multiple people
Manuel Ortiz or Halloween (wrestler) (born 1971), Mexican professional wrestler
Manuel Ortiz de Zárate (1887–1946), Chilean artist
Manuel Antonio Ortiz (fl. 1840–1841), president of Paraguay 1840–1841
Marisela Escobedo Ortiz (1958–2010), Mexican social activist, killed while protesting the murder of her daughter
Martha Ortiz, Mexican chef
Michael D. Ortiz, (born 1972) Chief Executive Officer, Layer 9 Data Centers
Omar Ortiz (born 1976), Mexican football (soccer) player
Opie Ortiz (contemporary), American tattoo artist
Ortiz (wrestler) (born 1991), American professional wrestler
Oscar Alberto Ortiz (born 1953), Argentine football player, and winner of the 1978 World Cup
Óscar Ortiz (El Salvador) (born 1961), Salvadoran politician
Óscar Ortiz (tennis) (born 1973), Mexican tennis player
Pascual Ortiz Rubio (1877–1963), president of Mexico 1930–1932
Paul Ortiz (contemporary), UK guitarist and musician
Pedro Ortiz Dávila (a.k.a. Davilita) (1912–1986), Puerto Rican popular singer
Ramón Ortiz (born 1973), Dominican baseball player
Raúl Scalabrini Ortiz (1898–1959), Argentine writer, journalist, essayist, and poet
Ricky Ortiz or Richard Young, American professional wrestler
Roberto María Ortiz (1886–1942), president of Argentina 1938–1942
Ronnie Ortiz-Magro, American television personality, Jersey Shore
Roxanne Dunbar-Ortiz (contemporary), American professor and activist
Russ Ortiz (born 1974), American baseball player
Shalim Ortiz (born 1979), Puerto Rican/Dominican-American singer and actor
Solomon P. Ortiz (born 1937), US Representative from Texas
Stalin Ortiz (born 1981), Colombian basketball player
Telma Ortiz Rocasolano (born 1973), sister of Letizia, Queen of Spain 
Tito Ortiz (born 1975), American mixed martial arts fighter
Tony Ortiz, American sportscaster and sports talk show host
Vergil Ortiz Jr. (born 1998), American boxer
Victor Ortiz (born 1987), American boxer
Víctor Manuel Ortiz (1965–2021), Puerto Rican politician
Xavier Ortiz (1962/72–2020), Mexican actor and singer
Yolanda Ortiz Espinosa (born 1978), Cuban diver
Yñigo Ortiz de Retez (fl. 1545), Spanish maritime explorer

Fictional people

 Liza Ortiz, character in the American television series, Fear the Walking Dead

See also

Comet White–Ortiz–Bolelli, comet discovered in 1970

References

Patronymic surnames
Spanish-language surnames
Surnames of Colombian origin
Surnames of Puerto Rican origin